Nezha is a protection deity in Chinese religion. His official Taoist name is "Marshal of the Central Altar". He was then given the title "Third Lotus Prince" after he became a deity.

Origins

According to Meir Shahar, Nezha is ultimately based on two figures from Hindu mythology. The first is a yaksha from the Ramayana named Nalakubar, the son of Yaksha King Kubera and nephew of the antagonist Ravana. The link to Nalakubar is established through variants in his Chinese name appearing in Buddhist sutras. The original variant Naluojiupoluo changed to Naluojubaluo, Nazhajuwaluo, and finally Nazha. The simple addition of the "mouth radical" to Na changes the name to the current form Nezha. The second figure is the child god Krishna. Both Krishna and Nezha are powerful children that defeat mighty serpents, Kaliya in the case of the former and Ao Bing in the latter. The Bhagavata Purana describes how Nalakubar was rescued from imprisonment within a tree by Krishna. A 10th-century Tantric Buddhist sutra mentions a child god that seems to be an amalgam of Krishna and Nalakubar called Nana. In addition, Nalakubar's father Kubera was eventually absorbed into the Buddhist pantheon as the Heavenly King Vaiśravaṇa. Shahar notes that Vaisravana was somehow connected to the historical Tang Dynasty general Li Jing. This explains the name and position of Nezha's father, the Pagoda-Bearing Heavenly King Li Jing.

Story

According to Fengshen Yanyi, Nezha was born during the Shang dynasty in a military fortress at Chentang Pass. His father was military commander Li Jing, who later became the "Pagoda-wielding Heavenly King". Nezha's mother, Lady Yin, gave birth to a ball of flesh after gestating for three years and six months. Li Jing thought that his wife had given birth to a demon and attacked the ball with his sword. The ball split open, and Nezha jumped out as a boy instead of an infant. Nezha could speak and walk immediately after birth. He was later accepted by the immortal Taiyi Zhenren as a student. He had two older brothers, Jinzha, a disciple of Wenshu Guangfa Tianzun, and Muzha.

One day, the people of Chentang Pass asked for rain and sacrificed much food to the East Sea Dragon King Ao Guang. The King rejected the food, instead, wanting girls and boys to eat. He sent Ye Sha to capture for him a girl and boy. Nezha and two other children were playing by the sea when Ye Sha appeared and captured one of Nezha's friends. Nezha then fought him and injured him severely, causing him to return to the King and beg for someone else to take care of Nezha. The Dragon King sent Ao Bing, his third son, whom Nezha then slew in combat. Ao Guang called for his brothers and confronted Nezha and his family. He threatened to flood Chentang Pass and report Nezha to the Jade Emperor. To save his family and the people, Nezha killed himself then, carving up his own flesh and dismembering his bones "returning" these to his parents in repayment for the debt of his birth. The Dragon Kings then hosted a huge celebration.

Nezha then appeared in his mother's dream. In the dream, he asked her to build a temple for him, so that his soul would have a place to rest. This constitutes a link to Nezha's birth because the night before Nezha was born, Lady Yin had a dream where a Taoist put something into her bosom and told her to take this child. For both incidences, a dream was used to communicate a message.

His mother then secretly built a temple for Nezha, and this temple later flourished. This temple became very well known and grew vastly because Nezha granted miracle cures to the sick and the crippled. However, Li Jing soon found out about this temple and burned it down because he was still angry at Nezha and felt that he had already caused too much trouble for their family.

Li Jing burning the temple caused Nezha to desire his father's death. Thus, enmity between father and son grew. Nezha was later brought back to life by his teacher, Taiyi Zhenren, who used lotus roots to construct a human body for his soul and gave him two new weapons: the Wind Fire Wheels and the Fire-tipped Spear. With the reincarnation of Nezha by his master, Li Jing and Nezha fought many battles. However, Li Jing soon realized that his mortal body was no match for Nezha and so ran for his life. On the run, he met his second son, Muzha, who fought and was defeated by Nezha. At this, Li Jing attempted suicide but was stopped by Wenshu Guangfa Tianzun, who also contained Nezha. In the end, Nezha was forced to submit to his father by another deity, Randeng Daoren.

Though according to The Journey to the West, Nezha was born with the word Ne written on the palm of his left hand and zha on his right, hence his name. But after he caused havoc in the Eastern Ocean, the Heavenly King had been so worried about the disastrous consequences that he decided to kill Nezha.

Thus Nezha returned his flesh and blood to his mother and bones to his father. Then Nezha's soul went to the Buddha, who resurrected him. After, he used his vast powers to subdue 96 caves of demons through dharma. After this Nezha wanted to kill his father because he had to remove every piece of flesh and every stain of blood to return his bones to his father. The heavenly king had no choice but to seek help from the Buddha. The Buddha gave him an intricately made golden pagoda, in each story of which were Buddhas radiant with splendor. The Buddha told Nezha to regard these Buddhas as his father. Thus ending the hatred between the father and the son. Thus earning Li Jing the title Pagoda-Bearing Heavenly king.

Nezha is often depicted as a youth, instead of an adult. He is often shown flying in the sky riding on the Wind Fire Wheels, has the Universe Ring around his body (sometimes in his left hand), the Red Armillary Sash around his shoulders and a Fire-tipped Spear in his right hand. Sometimes, he is shown in his "three heads and six arms" form. He has the ability to spit rainbows in some legends.

In mythology and literature
Nezha has frequently appeared in Chinese mythology and ancient Chinese literature such as Fengshen Yanyi (or Investiture of the Gods), although the story of Nezha Conquering the Sea is the most well known among Chinese households.

In Journey to the West, Nezha was a general under his father, "Pagoda-wielding Heavenly King" Li Jing. He fought the Monkey King, Sun Wukong, when the latter rebelled against the Jade Emperor. They later became friends. Nezha made some appearances in the novel to help the four protagonists defeat powerful demons including his adoptive sister, Lady Earth Flow.

In other media

Film and television 

Nezha has been the central character in over 20 different films and television programs, both live-action and animated, dating back at least as early as a  pre-communist Chinese live-action feature film, Nézhā Chūshì, produced by the Great Wall Film Company and premiered, according to differing accounts, in either 1927 or 1928., In addition, he has appeared as a supporting character in numerous others, chiefly among the many adaptations of Investiture of the Gods and Journey to the West.

The character increased in popularity in 1979 with the traditionally-animated feature film Nezha Conquers the Dragon King, which was screened at the 1980 Cannes Film Festival and is considered one of the great classic works of Chinese animation. On 30 May 2014, Google paid homage to this film with an animated doodle on their Hong Kong search engine's homepage.

In 2003, China Central Television began the broadcast of a new children's traditionally-animated series The Legend of Nezha, which originally ran from 2003 to 2004, for a total of 52 episodes.

In 2016, a stereoscopic, computer-animated feature film, I Am Nezha, was released in China.

On 26 July 2019, another stereoscopic, computer-animated feature film, Ne Zha,() was more successful, setting numerous all-time records for box-office grosses, including third-highest-grossing of all films in China and highest-grossing animated film from outside the United States. A comment from www.fjsen.com says, Based on the previous work, the film is bold and innovative, which not only retains the essence of Chinese traditional culture, but also adds popular elements, making the culture to be displayed more easily accepted by the audience. It breaks the stereotype, emphasizes self-independence, and gives consideration to reality with metaphor. There are many scenes that reflect on the secular and ugly sides of society in the film. Compared with the truth, many people are more willing to believe in hearsay and then look at people with colored glasses. Nezha, a rebellious superhero, though seemingly rebellious to tradition, still retain the most positive passion and moving, still have the value orientation of Chinese culture of dedication and responsibility.

The 2021 animated film New Gods: Nezha Reborn depicts Nezha reincarnated in a cyberpunk setting 3,000 years after the original story.

A 2017 announcement from the leadership of Hasbro confirmed that Nezha will appear in a crossover with the Transformers franchise. The series, titled Nezha: Transformers, consists of 52 11-minute episodes and is produced by Allspark Animation and China Central Television.

The character has also been evoked outside of the fantasy genre, in realistic contemporary and period drama films as a byword for a rebellious, nonconformist young person, such as in Rebels of the Neon God (1992), Spin Kid (2011), Nezha (2014) and Operation Mekong (2016, in which a character is codenamed Nezha).

Nezha is featured as a character in the 2020 TV series Lego Monkie Kid

Video games 
Nezha is a playable character in Koei Tecmo's crossover series Warriors Orochi. The series features two different versions of Nezha, a cyborg and his human self.

Ne Zha is a playable character in the multiplayer online battle arena video game Smite, where he is a melee assassin.

On December 16, 2015, third-person shooter action game Warframe released a playable character named and themed after Nezha.

Nezha is also a collectible character in Netmarble's mobile RPG Seven Knights where the character, while depicted as female, retains much of Nezha's mythos and characteristics.

Nezha is also a summonable Heroic Spirit in the popular Japanese hero collector game Fate/Grand Order where she can be summoned as a Lancer-class Servant. In the game, she is depicted as a female automaton. The game's second storyline, Cosmos in the Lostbelt, explores an alternate history where Qin Shi Huang successfully becomes immortal by studying her body, allowing him to rule China into the present day.

Nezha is also a summonable Astromon in the Korean creature capture game Monster Super League developed by 4:33 and Creative Labs. In the game, he is depicted as female.

Nezha is also a summonable character in the Japanese LGBT+ Mobile Game Tokyo Afterschool Summoners developed by Lifewonders. Within the game he is depicted as non-binary.

In 2022, the video game Overwatch (2016), made a skin based on Nezha for a female character as part of the Lunar New Year Event.

In the 2022 mobile game Dislyte, The character Li Ling is given the powers of Nezha.

Other media 
Nezha, with his fire-tipped spear, is the title character in the casino game "The Third Prince." The game's battle feature draws on elements of Nezha's story.

Religion
Nezha is worshipped in Chinese folk religion and is called "Marshal of the Central Altar" or "Prince Nezha", the "Third Prince".

As in traditional folklore, Nezha flies around swiftly on his wind fire wheels, so he is also regarded as the tutelary god of many professional drivers, like trucks, taxis, or sightseeing bus drivers. They tend to place a small statue of Nezha in the vehicles for a safe drive.

Nezha is also often regarded as the patron god of children and filial piety. Parents would make an offering to Nezha with the hope that their children would grow up strong, healthy, and be dutiful and respectful.

See also
 Bala Krishna
 Chinese mythology in popular culture
 Nalakuvara

References

External links 
 

Chinese gods
Folklore characters
Heroes in mythology and legend
Investiture of the Gods characters
Journey to the West characters
Male characters in fairy tales
Deities in Taoism
Trickster gods
Vaiśravaṇa